A Golden Elk is a shooter that is made with two parts Jägermeister and one part Goldschläger. It has also been called a "Starry Night" or "24 Karat Nightmare".

The name Golden Elk is derived from the gold in Goldschläger and the image of the stag that appears on bottles of Jägermeister.

A Liquid Cocaine is a shooter that is a variation of the Golden Elk. It is made with one part Jägermeister, one part Goldschläger and one part Bacardi 151. It may be shaken with ice, or not.

References

Shooters (drinks)